Jana Novotná and Arantxa Sánchez Vicario defeated the two-time defending champions Gigi Fernández and Natasha Zvereva in a rematch of the previous year's final, 6–2, 6–1 to win the doubles tennis title at the 1995 WTA Tour Championships. It was Novotná's second Tour Finals doubles title and Sánchez Vicario's first.

Seeds
Champion seeds are indicated in bold text while text in italics indicates the round in which those seeds were eliminated.

  Gigi Fernández /  Natasha Zvereva (final)
  Jana Novotná /  Arantxa Sánchez Vicario (champions)
  Meredith McGrath /  Larisa Neiland (semifinals)
  Nicole Arendt /  Manon Bollegraf (semifinals)

Draw

References

External links
 Official results archive (ITF)
 Official results archive (WTA)
WTA Site

1995 WTA Tour
Doubles